Hesudra bisecta is a moth of the family Erebidae. It was described by Walter Rothschild in 1912. It is found on Borneo.

References

Lithosiina
Moths described in 1912